Aurelio Griani (died 1576) was a Roman Catholic prelate who served as Bishop of Lettere-Gragnano (1570–1576).

Biography
Aurelio Griani was ordained a priest in the Order of Friars Minor. On 8 November 1570, he was appointed during the papacy of Pope Pius V as Bishop of Lettere-Gragnano. 
On 19 November 1570, he was consecrated bishop by Scipione Rebiba, Cardinal-Priest of Santa Maria in Trastevere, with Nicola Perusco, Bishop of Civita Castellana e Orte, and Francesco Rusticucci, Bishop of Fano, serving as co-consecrators. 
He served as Bishop of Lettere-Gragnano until his death in 1576.

References

External links and additional sources
 (for Chronology of Bishops) 
 (for Chronology of Bishops)  

16th-century Italian Roman Catholic bishops
Bishops appointed by Pope Pius V
1576 deaths